One of Those Days is the first independent extended play from former Christian pop artist Joy Williams.

Promotion
"Charmed Life" was featured on the season 5 finale of ABC's Grey's Anatomy, while "One of Those Days" was heard on an episode of Lifetime's Drop Dead Diva.

Track listing

Singles
"One of Those Days" was released as a single in early 2009. It peaked at #25 on Christian pop radio. The music video for the song premiered on April 2.
"Charmed Life" was released as a digital remixes EP on May 28, 2009 to promote the song". An acoustic music video premiered on May 14, 2009.

"Charmed Life" (Olaj Remix)
"Charmed Life" (Bronleewe & Bose Remix)
"I'm Gonna Break Your Heart" (Lark Remix)

References

2009 EPs
Joy Williams (singer) albums